Asterivora fasciata is a species of moth in the family Choreutidae. It is endemic to New Zealand and has been found at Arthur's Pass. The larvae of this species have been reared on  Celmisia densiflora and adults are on the wing in January.

Taxonomy 
This species was first described by Alfred Philpott in 1930, using specimens collected by C. E. Clarke at Arthur's Pass in January, and named Simaethis fasciata. In 1939 George Hudson discussed and illustrated this species under that name. In 1979 J. S. Dugdale placed this species within the genus Asterivora. In 1988 Dugdale confirmed this placement. The male holotype specimen, collected in the Arthur's Pass, is held at the Auckland War Memorial Museum.

Description 

Philpott described this species as follows:

Philpott stated that this species is distinguishable by the dark median band on the forewings.

Behaviour 
The adults of this species is on the wing in January.

Hosts 

The larvae of this species have been reared on Celmisia densiflora.

References

Asterivora
Moths of New Zealand
Endemic fauna of New Zealand
Moths described in 1930
Taxa named by Alfred Philpott
Endemic moths of New Zealand